Samuel Provoost (March 11, 1742 – September 6, 1815) was an American Clergyman. He was the first Chaplain of the United States Senate and the first Bishop of the Episcopal Diocese of New York, as well as the third  Presiding Bishop of the Episcopal Church, USA.  He was consecrated as bishop of New York in 1787 with Bishop William White. He was the first Episcopal Bishop of Dutch and Huguenot ancestry.

Early life
Samuel Provoost was born in New York City, New York to John Provoost and Eva Rutgers on 26 February 1742. He was baptized  on 28 February 1742 (The Roosevelt Genealogy, 1649–1902). He was a descendant of William Provoost, who was of a Huguenot family (some of the early settlers in Quebec). His paternal grandmother was Mary (née Spratt) Alexander (1693–1760).

Provoost was educated at King's College, now known as Columbia University, graduating in 1758. In 1761 he arrived in England and continued his studies at Peterhouse, Cambridge.  Samuel was fluent in Hebrew, Greek and Latin, and while he was at the College he learned French and Italian gaining the distinction as a linguist. Samuel Provoost also matriculated at the University of Leiden, July 28, 1764.

Career
In February 1766, Provoost was ordained a deacon at the Chapel Royal of St James's Palace in Westminster and a priest in March 1766. In September 1766, he sailed to New York with his wife and in December he became an assistant rector of Trinity Church. Provoost's dry preaching style, along his support for American independence, offended some church members and in 1769 a motion was made in the vestry to dispense with his services. The vestry subsequently resolved "That Mr. Provoost be continued, and paid by what can be raised by subscription only," but funds weren't forthcoming and in 1771 Provoost resigned and settled in Dutchess County near his friends Walter Livingston and Robert R. Livingston.

During his 13 years there he preached occasionally in neighboring churches, and joined his neighbors in their pursuit of the British after the burning of the town of Esopus, but he declined offers to serve as a delegate to the Provincial Congress and as chaplain of the New York Constitutional Convention of 1777, as well as the rectorship of churches in Charleston, South Carolina, and Boston.

In 1783, after the end of the American Revolutionary War, the outspoken Tory rector of Trinity Church, Charles Inglis (the future first Anglican Bishop in Canada), left for England and was replaced by assistant rector Benjamin Moore, who had stayed at Trinity through the British occupation. Returning Patriots objected and in 1784 installed Provoost as rector of Trinity, with Moore agreeing to stay on as assistant rector. In 1785, he was named chaplain of the Continental Congress.

The Episcopal Church of the United States broke away from the Church of England and held its first General Convention in 1785. In 1786 Provoost was elected first Bishop of New York at the Diocesan Convention.  A short while later, he was honored with the degree of Doctor of Divinity from the University of Pennsylvania.  In 1787, Provoost was consecrated with Dr. William White at Lambeth Place by Dr. John Moore. Provoost was elected Chaplain to the Senate in 1789. Due to health issues, he resigned the rectorship of Trinity in 1800. The following year, Provoost sought to relinquish his episcopal office, but the House of Bishops declined his resignation, instead appointing Moore as Adjutant Bishop. Provoost effectively retired, but remained Bishop until his death in 1815.

Personal life
On June 8, 1766, he married Maria Bousfield (d. 1799) who was the daughter of Thomas Bousfield, a rich Irish banker and the sister of Benjamin Bousfield, a Sheriff of Cork City.  Their children were:

 Maria Provoost (1770–1837), who married Cadwallader D. Colden (1769–1834) in 1793.
 Benjamin Bousfield Provoost (1776–1841), who married Nellie French (d. 1863) in 1803, and had 8 children.
 John Provoost (d. 1800), who died young.
 Susanna Elizabeth Provoost, who married George Rapalje (1771–1885) in 1798. and later Dr. Julian Xavier Charbet (1792–1859).

His wife died in August 1799.  Bishop Provoost died in 1815 due to a stroke.

Consecrators
 John Moore, 88th Archbishop of Canterbury
 William Markham, 77th Archbishop of York
 Charles Moss, Bishop of Bath and Wells
Samuel Provoost was the third bishop consecrated for the Episcopal Church of the United States.

See also
 List of presiding bishops of the Episcopal Church in the United States of America
 List of Episcopal bishops of the United States
 Historical list of the Episcopal bishops of the United States

References
Notes

Sources
 W. S. Perry, The History of the American Episcopal Church, 1587-1883 (Boston, 1885)
 The Centennial History of the Protestant Episcopal Church in the Diocese of New York, 1785-1885, edited by J. G. Wilson, (New York, 1886)

External links
 Historical Documents about Provoost from Project Canterbury
U.S. Senate Chaplains
Samuel Provoost records at Trinity Wall Street Archives

1742 births
1815 deaths
American people of Dutch descent
American people of Scottish descent
Religious leaders from New York City
Chaplains of the United States Senate
Episcopal bishops of New York
Presiding Bishops of the Episcopal Church in the United States of America
18th-century Anglican bishops in the United States
British North American Anglicans
Huguenot participants in the American Revolution
Alumni of Peterhouse, Cambridge
Leiden University alumni
Burials at Trinity Church Cemetery
People of the Province of New York
Columbia College (New York) alumni
19th-century American Episcopalians
18th-century American clergy